Dysgonia coreana is a moth of the family Noctuidae first described by John Henry Leech in 1889. It is found in Korea and the Russian Far East (the Primorye region).

Dysgonia coreana is treated as a synonym of Dysgonia obscura by some authors.

References

External links
Insects of Korea

Dysgonia
Insects of Korea